Harrison High School (HHS) is a public high school near the junction of Interstate 25 and Circle Drive on the southwest side of Colorado Springs, Colorado. It is one of two high schools in the Harrison School District 2.

Notable people

Alumni
Raquel Pennington (class of 2007), professional mixed martial arts fighter, competing in the UFC's bantamweight division
Devonte Upson (born 1993), basketball player in the Israeli Basketball Premier League

Staff
Terry Dunn, boys' basketball coach (1982–1990)
Ardie McInelly, girls' basketball coach (2013–2016)

References

External links 

High schools in Colorado Springs, Colorado
Public high schools in Colorado